Cyril Robinson may refer to:

 Cyril Robinson (footballer) (1929–2019), English footballer
 Cyril Robinson (cricketer) (1873–1948), English cricketer
 Cyril E. Robinson, English historian, writer and teacher